Ratu Hemas of Yogyakarta (born 31 October 1952) is the current Queen consort of Yogyakarta Sultanate, a reigning sultanate of the Special Region of Yogyakarta in Indonesia. She has also served as a senator of the Indonesian Regional Representative Council (DPD) from Yogyakarta since 2004. She served as a Deputy Speaker of the DPD from 2009 to 2019.

Early life
 Ratu Hemas, born as Tatiek Dradjad Supriastuti is the third child and sole daughter of seven siblings. She grew up in Kebayoran Lama, South Jakarta. Her Father, Colonel Soepono Digdosastropranoto, was an official in the Indonesia Army who was born in Yogyakarta. Her Mother, Raden Nganten Susamtilah Soepono, was a housewife from Wates, Kulonprogo. Hemas went to school in Jakarta until she graduated from High School and continued to pursue her study in the department of Architecture in Trisakti University. She did not finish her study in the university and got married in 1968 Hemas then followed her husband and live in Yogyakarta

Meeting the Sultan Hamengkubuwono X
Every year Tatiek's family has the family tradition to go to her grandfather's house in Soronatan, Yogyakarta. Her grandfather was a retired palace official. In the late 1960s, Tatiek met the oldest son of the late reigning Sultan Hamengkubuwono IX, Herjuno Darpito, who, later on, succeeded his father as Sultan Hamengkubuwono X. At the age of 19 Hemas was married to Herjuno Darpito (6 years older) and left her study in the university. Her name was changed for the first time as Bandara Raden Ayu Mangkubumi, before finally was changed to Gusti Kanjeng Ratu Hemas when Herjuno Darpito ascend the throne and became Sri Sultan Hamengkubuwono X. Her marriage was blessed with five children; Princess Mangkubumi, Princess Candrakirana, Princess Maduretno, Princess Hayu, and Princess Bendara.

Political and social activities
 In the beginning, Ratu Hemas activities in the palace of Yogyakarta were mostly social. She was active in Yayasan Sayap Ibu and the eradication of illiteracy in Yogyakarta. She became a member of People's Consultative Assembly for the period of 1997–1999 from the Faction of Group Representatives (Indonesian: Fraksi Utusan Golongan) and served as the chief editor for Kartini magazine
 Ratu Hemas has always been very active on promoting women participation on political processes. To further promote women's rights, in 2004 Ratu Hemas ran as a senator for the Regional Representative Council to represent her province, Yogyakarta Special Region , as an independent candidate. She won the majority of the votes from her region. 
 In November 2008 during an interview with VIVAnews, Ratu Hemas explained her political view against the pornography law Undang Undang Pornografi. She mentioned that the bill has been drafted in such a way that would restrict women's rights.   
 In 2009, Ratu Hemas was reelected again as independent candidate for the Regional Representative Council for the period of 2009–2014 winning 80% votes from all eligible voters. 
 In November 2012 Ratu Hemas together with Laode Ida, I Wayan Sudirta, and John Pieris representing the Regional Representative Council, appealed the Constitutional Court to run a judicial review on the Law No. 27 Year 2009 and Law No. 12 Year 2011. These laws were considered as violating the clauses of the constitution, especially clause number 22 D concerning equal rights between the Regional Representative Council and the People's Representative Council. In legislation process so far, the Regional Representative Council was granted the authority to provide inputs but not to sanction the law. The Regional Representative Council request the authority to also sanction a law. According to the constitution, the Regional Representative Council has the right to propose a bill and it has exercised this right but has never been deliberated in the house.

Titles
1952 - 1971 : Miss Tatiek Drajad Supriastuti
1971 - 1989 : Her Royal Highness The Princess Mangkubumi
1989–present : Her Majesty Queen Hemas

References

1952 births
Living people
People from Yogyakarta
Indonesian royalty
Javanese people